Papilio gambrisius is a species of swallowtail butterfly from the genus Papilio that is found in Serang, Moluccas, Ambon Island, Seram and Buru.

Subspecies
Papilio gambrisius gambrisius (Serang, Ambon)
Papilio gambrisius colossus Fruhstorfer, 1899 (Ceram)
Papilio gambrisius buruanus Rothschild, 1897 (Buru)

Taxonomy
Papilio gambrisius is a member of the aegeus  species-group. The clade members are
Papilio aegeus Donovan, 1805 
Papilio bridgei Mathew, 1886
 ? Papilio erskinei Mathew, 1886
Papilio gambrisius Cramer, [1777]
Papilio inopinatus Butler, 1883
Papilio ptolychus Godman & Salvin, 1888
Papilio tydeus C. & R. Felder, 1860
Papilio weymeri Niepelt, 1914
Papilio woodfordi Godman & Salvin, 1888

References

gambrisus
Butterflies described in 1777
Butterflies of Asia